Smithers station is a railway station in Smithers, British Columbia. It is on the Canadian National Railway mainline and serves Via Rail's Jasper–Prince Rupert train. The station was designated a national heritage railway station in 1990.

See also

 List of designated heritage railway stations of Canada

Footnotes

External links 
Via Rail Station Description

Via Rail stations in British Columbia
Designated Heritage Railway Stations in British Columbia
Smithers, British Columbia
Year of establishment missing